Air Canada Pilots Association is a Canadian labour union that represents pilots at Air Canada and Air Canada Rouge.
ACPA was formed when the pilots of Air Canada voted to leave The Canadian Airline Pilot Association in a vote tabulated 09 Nov 1995. 94.8% of eligible voters resoundingly rejected CALPA giving 1146 votes to ACPA and 366 votes to CALPA. Contract negotiations commenced with Air Canada immediately.

References

External links

Airline pilots' trade unions
Transport trade unions in Canada
Aviation organizations based in Canada